Parliamentary elections were held in Portugal on 11 April 1869.

Results

References

1869
1869 elections in Europe
1869 in Portugal
April 1869 events